Locked By Land is a compilation album of the first and second EPs by Australian indie band Jinja Safari. It was released in 2011 on Cooperative Music Australia.

Track listing
"Sunken House" - 3:36
"Mud" - 3:51
"Hiccups" - 3:26
"Peter Pan" - 3:23
"Moonchild" - 4:44
"Families" - 3:26
"Stepping Stones" - 4:48
"Scarecrow" - 4:25
"Vagabond" - 4:11
"Head In a Blender" - 3:16
"Forest Eyes" - 3:46
"Errol Flynn" - 3:36
"Mermaids" - 4:54
"Peter Pan (Fishing Sandy Pant Remix)" - 3:22
"Hiccups (Butcher Blades Ice Cream Nightmare Remix)" - 3:40

2011 albums